Kattupookkal is a 1965 Indian Malayalam-language film, directed and produced by K. Thankappan. The film stars Madhu, Adoor Bhasi, Thikkurissy Sukumaran Nair and Devika. The film had musical score by G. Devarajan.

Cast
Madhu as Dr. Johny
Adoor Bhasi
Thikkurissy Sukumaran Nair as Thomachan
Devika as Anni
Chithradevi as Mery
Jayanthi
O. Madhavan as Lonachan
 Paravoor Bharathan as Kariyachan
 Manavalan Joseph as Insurance Agent 
 Nellikode Bhaskaran
Philomina
S. P. Pillai
Kumari Padmini as Kamalam
Sujatha
 Adoor Pankajam
 Shanthapriya
 Nilambur Ayisha
 Kottayam Chellappan as Priest
 Mathew
 Master Suresh as Venu
 Uthaman
 John
 Kalakkal Kumaran
Vijaya Kumari

Soundtrack
The music was composed by G. Devarajan and the lyrics were written by O. N. V. Kurup.

References

External links
 

1965 films
1960s Malayalam-language films